Antonio de Benavides y Bazán (1612–1691) was a Roman Catholic prelate who served as Patriarch of West Indies (1679–1691), Titular Archbishop of Tyrus (1679–1691), and Apostolic Internuncio to Spain (1689–1690 and 1670).

Biography
Antonio de Benavides y Bazán was born in 1612 in Madrid, Spain.
In Jul 1670, he was appointed during the papacy of Pope Clement X as Apostolic Internuncio to Spain but resigned soon afterward in October 1670.
On 10 Apr 1679, he was appointed during the papacy of Pope Innocent XI as Titular Archbishop of Tyrus and on 8 May 1679, named Patriarch of West Indies.
On 28 May 1679, he was consecrated bishop by Savo Millini, Titular Archbishop of Caesarea in Cappadocia, with Antonio de Isla y Mena, Bishop of Osma, and Antonio Ibarra, Bishop of Almería, serving as co-consecrators. 
In Sep 1689, he was again appointed during the papacy of Pope Alexander VIII as Apostolic Internuncio to Spain; he resigned in Aug 1690.
He served as Patriarch of West Indies until his death on 22 Jan 1691.

References

External links and additional sources
 (for Chronology of Bishops) 
 (for Chronology of Bishops)  
 (for Chronology of Bishops) 
 (for Chronology of Bishops) 
 
 

17th-century Roman Catholic bishops in New Spain
Bishops appointed by Pope Clement X
Bishops appointed by Pope Innocent XI
Bishops appointed by Pope Alexander VIII
1612 births
1691 deaths